Hiragana is a Unicode block containing hiragana characters for the Japanese language.

Block

History
The following Unicode-related documents record the purpose and process of defining specific characters in the Hiragana block:

See also 
 Enclosed Ideographic Supplement (Unicode block) has a single hiragana character: U+1F200
 Kana Supplement (Unicode block) has a single katakana and 255 hentaigana characters
 Kana Extended-A (Unicode block) continues with additional 31 hentaigana characters
 Kana Extended-B (Unicode block) continues with additional kana for Taiwanese Hokkien
 Small Kana Extension (Unicode block) has four hiragana characters: U+1B132 and U+1B150–U+1B152

References 

Unicode blocks